Coleophora crepidinella is a moth of the family Coleophoridae. It is found on the Iberian Peninsula, Mallorca, Sardinia, Sicily and in Greece.

The larvae feed on Beta maritima. They create a cylindrical, 6–7 mm long, tubular silken case with a mouth angle of 75-80°. The rim of the mouth is dark brown, fading to light brown more to the rear. At flowering time the larvae feed on the ground leaves. Later, they feed on the fruits.

References

crepidinella
Moths described in 1847
Moths of Europe